The Imam Reza Stadium  is a football stadium in Tehran, Iran.  It is the training ground of Esteghlal. The stadium, which has a capacity of 12,000 people, opened in 2010.

See also
 Esteghlal

References

Football venues in Iran
Stadium
Sports venues in Tehran
Stadium